The 2009–10 Western Michigan Broncos men's basketball team was an NCAA Division I college basketball team representing Western Michigan University. The team was the two-time defending Mid-American Conference (MAC) West Division champion.  WMU was coached by Steve Hawkins who was in his seventh season as head coach of the school.  The Broncos played their home games at University Arena in Kalamazoo, Michigan. They finished the season 18–15, 8–8 in MAC play and lost in the semifinals of the 2010 MAC men's basketball tournament.

Pre-season
Western Michigan was picked to finish fifth in the MAC's West Division by members of the MAC News Media Panel.  The Broncos received four first-place votes.  Senior guard David Kool was selected to the All-MAC West Division Pre-season team.

This season also marked the return of assistant coach Clayton Bates who had left the team for a season in order to work in the private sector. Bates previously served as assistant coach at Western Michigan for eight seasons.  Bates replaced former assistant coach Andy Hipsher.  Hipsher left WMU to become director of basketball operations at USF.

Awards
 David Kool
 All-MAC West Division Pre-season team
 West Division Player of the Week
 Week 5 – For the week, Kool averaged 23.5 points per game on 45.7% shooting, 42.9% shooting from three-point range and 100% shooting from the free throw line.  Against Eastern Illinois, Kool produced the highest-scoring game of any player in the MAC this season with 34 points.  He made a career-high eight three-pointers out of a career-high 11 field goals in 18 attempts.
 Week 6 – In WMU's only game of the week, Kool led his team over Kennesaw State with 20 points, seven rebounds, two assists and two steals. Kool scored nine of WMU's final 11 points of the game, including a three-pointer with 2:16 remaining that gave WMU the lead for the rest of the game.
 Mid-American Conference Male Scholar Athlete of the Week 
 Week 15 (Dec. 18)
 Week 16 (Dec. 23)
 Week 18 (Jan. 8) 
 Martelle McLemore
 West Division Player of the Week
 Week 2 – Set career highs with 22 points, nine rebounds and four assists against VCU. McLemore converted on 9–13 from the field, including 8–9 on two-point field goals and 3–3 free throw shooting.
 Alex Wolf
 West Division Player of the Week
 Week 7 – Wolf earned player of the week honors based on his performance at the Diamond Head Classic.
 Mid-American Conference Male Scholar Athlete of the Week
 Week 17 (Jan. 1)

Diamond Head Classic

The Broncos finished fifth out of eight teams in the December 2009 Diamond Head Classic.  After losing the first game to eventual champion USC, WMU defeated Northeastern and the College of Charleston to finish the tournament 2–1.  Western Michigan led USC 27–18 at the half and 47–46 with 4:24 to go in the game. WMU gave champion USC their toughest game of the tournament.

The tournament was the breakout performance for junior walk-on guard Alex Wolf, who scored 28 total points in the final two games of the tournament.  Wolf had scored only 11 career points until the point.  In the tournament, Wolf earned career highs in points (15) and rebounds (5) and made his first career three-point field goal.  Wolf averaged 11 points, four rebounds and one assist per game and made six out of eight three-point field goals and four out of six free throws.  For his accomplishments, Wolf was named MAC West Co-Player of the Week.

Roster

Schedule

|-
!colspan=9 style="background:#6a3e0f; color:#e3bc85;"| Exhibition

|-
!colspan=9 style="background:#6a3e0f; color:#e3bc85;"| Regular season

|-
!colspan=9 style="background:#6a3e0f; color:#e3bc85;"| MAC Tournament

References

Western Michigan
Western Michigan Broncos men's basketball seasons